The 2008 Presidential Cycling Tour of Turkey, the 44th running of the race, took place from April 13 to April 20, 2008.

Stages

Teams

25 teams started the race – each had 6 riders at the start of the tour i.e., 150 started in total. The teams were:

Pro Teams
 
 
 
 
 
Pro-Continental teams
 PSK Whirlpool–Author
 Mitsubishi–Jartazi
 CSF Group–Navigare
 Benfica
 Extremadura
 Karpin–Galicia
 NGC Medical–OTC Industria Porte
 Serramenti PVC Diquigiovanni–Androni Giocattoli
Continental teams
 Tyrol–Team Radland Tirol
 AC Sparta Praha
 Team Ista
 Cosmote Kastro
 Centri della Calzatura Partizan
 Hadimec AG
 Atlas–Romer's Hausbäckerei
 Steg Computer–CKT Cogeas
 Brisa Cycling Team
National teams
 Turkish national team
 Dutch national team
 Irish national team

References

External links

Presidential Cycling Tour of Turkey by year
Presidential
Tour of Turkey